The men's 200 metre freestyle competition at the 1999 Pan Pacific Swimming Championships took place on August 23–24 at the Sydney International Aquatic Centre.  The last champion was Michael Klim of Australia.

This race consisted of four lengths of the pool, all in freestyle.

Records
Prior to this competition, the existing world and Pan Pacific records were as follows:

Results
All times are in minutes and seconds.

Heats
The first round was held on August 23.

Semifinals
The semifinals were held on August 23.

Final 
The final was held on August 24.

References

1999 Pan Pacific Swimming Championships